David Hollatz (Wulkow, near Stargard (34 km ESE of Stettin), in Pomerania, 1648 - Jakobshagen (24 km E of Stargard) 17 April 1713) was a German Lutheran theologian. He studied at Erfurt and Wittenberg, and became preacher at Pützerlin near Stargard in 1670, at Stargard in 1681 (in 1683 also conrector), rector in Colberg in 1684, and pastor in Jakobshagen in 1692.

Works
His principal work is his Examen theologicum acroamaticum (Rostock - afterward Stockholm - and Leipzig, 1707; 7th and 8th eds. by Romanus Teller, 1750 and 1763). The work is the last of the strict Lutheran systems of dogmatics in the era of Lutheran orthodoxy. Hollatz knows Pietism, but does not mention it, although he refutes mysticism. The system is divided into quaestiones, which are explained by probationes; these are followed by antitheses, against which the different instantia are brought forward. Hollatz also published Scrutinium veritatis in mysticorum dogmata (Wittenberg, 1711); Ein gottgeheiligt dreifaches Kleeblatt (Leidender Jesus) (1713); a collection of sermons; and other works.

References

Translated Works
From Examen Theologicum Acroamaticum
The Restoration and Resurrection of the Dead (Part I) Tr. by Kirk E. Lahmann
The Restoration and Resurrection of the Dead (Part II) Tr. by Kirk E. Lahmann
The Highest Mystery of the Most Holy Trinity in the Old Testament Tr. by Nathaniel J. Biebert
Baptism and the Means of Salvation Tr. by Nathaniel J. Biebert

External links
Studium Excitare: Biography of David Hollaz by Kirk E. Lahmann

1648 births
1713 deaths
People from Stargard County
People from the Province of Pomerania
18th-century German Lutheran clergy
German Lutheran theologians
German male non-fiction writers
17th-century Latin-language writers
18th-century German Protestant theologians
18th-century German male writers
17th-century German male writers
University of Erfurt alumni
University of Wittenberg alumni
17th-century German Lutheran clergy
17th-century Lutheran theologians
18th-century Lutheran theologians